Ivan Dodig was the defending champion; however, he lost 3–6, 6–3, 3–6 to Karol Beck in the semifinal.
Édouard Roger-Vasselin won in the final, because Karol Beck retired when the result was 6–7(5), 6–3, 1–0 for the Frenchman.

Seeds

Draw

Finals

Top half

Bottom half

External links
 Main Draw
 Qualifying Draw

BH Telecom Indoors - Singles
2010 Singles